Joseph Nicholas Delahanty (October 18, 1875 in Cleveland, Ohio – January 29, 1936 in Cleveland, Ohio), was a professional baseball player who played outfielder in the major leagues from 1907 to 1909. He was one of five Delahanty brothers to play in the majors: the others were Ed, Frank, Jim, and Tom.

Delahanty started his professional career in 1897. He had his breakthrough year in 1907, hitting .355 for Williamsport of the Tri-State League. In August, he was purchased by the St. Louis Cardinals. He became the team's regular left fielder the following season and played with them through 1909.  On Joe's major league debut in 1907, the Delahanty brothers broke the record for the most siblings ever to play major league baseball (five), a record which still stands.  The previous record (four) had been established in 1901 by the Cross brothers: Amos, Lave, Joe and Frank.

After his baseball career ended, Delahanty worked in a sheriff's office.

References

External links

1875 births
1936 deaths
Major League Baseball outfielders
St. Louis Cardinals players
Fall River Indians players
Newport Colts players
Allentown Peanuts players
Paterson Weavers players
Montreal Royals players
Worcester Hustlers players
Worcester Riddlers players
Memphis Egyptians players
New Orleans Pelicans (baseball) players
Buffalo Bisons (minor league) players
Williamsport Millionaires players
Toronto Maple Leafs (International League) players
Wilkes-Barre Barons (baseball) players
Cleveland Forest City players
Baseball players from Cleveland